Korea National Arboretum is an over-500-year-old arboretum located in Pocheon city of Gyeonggi Province of South Korea. It is widely known as "Gwangneung Forest" by the public. It is designated as UNESCO World Network of Biosphere Reserve and the country's 11th natural monument.

Its history can be traced back to Joseon Dynasty. The planting of large forests started during the reign of Sejo of Joseon. He and Queen Jeonghui designated the area for a tomb which later named Gwangneung. Their tomb is one of Royal Tombs of the Joseon Dynasty, a UNESCO World Heritage Site. Following the construction of the tomb, it and its surrounding areas were designated as royal forest and kept under strict protection which lasted throughout post-Joseon history. The area was devastated during the Korean war. From 1983 to 1987, the central government went under project to develop the area as an arboretum with a forest museum. Upon its completion in 1987, it was finally open to the general public. In 1999 its status was elevated to National Arboretum becoming the first of its kind in the country's history.

The arboretum includes the white-bellied woodpecker and 900 plant species.

References

External links

Environment of South Korea
Pocheon
Arboreta
Parks in Gyeonggi Province
Forestry in South Korea
Botanical gardens in South Korea
Biosphere reserves of South Korea